Count Pyotr Andreevich Kleinmichel (tr. ), also known by German name Peter von Kleinmichel (30 November 1789 – 3 February 1869), was Minister of Transport of Imperial Russia (1842–1855).

He fought at the Battle of Leipzig and the Battle of Borodino. In March 1814, Alexander I was concerned for the safety of his brothers Nicholas and Constantine, who were involved in the occupation of Paris. He dispatched Kleinmichel to warn them and advise them to return to Basel. After succeeding in this, Kleinmichel was made Aide-de-Camp to the Tsar. The event also brought him to the attention of the future Tsar Nicholas I

He was responsible for building the Saint Petersburg–Moscow Railway and for restoring the Winter Palace after the 1837 fire. It was rumored that Nicholas I promoted his career because Kleinmichel adopted the Emperor's illegitimate children as his own. His first wife divorced him, citing his sexual dysfunction.

Family 
Kleinmichel was married twice, first in 1816 to Varvara Kokoshkina (died 1842), the granddaughter of the business magnate Alexei Turchaninov. They divorced, according to rumours, because of his impotence.

In 1832 Kleinmichel married Kleopatra Petrovna Ilyinskaya (October 17, 1811 – January 17, 1865), the relative of Varvara Nelidova. She died of tuberculosis in Paris, and was buried in St. Petersburg. She was known in the society as the woman who adopted Nicholas I's illegitimate children. They had eight children.
 Yelizaveta (1833–1896), married the lieutenant general Pilar von Pilchau.
 Aleksandra (1835–1912), lady-in-waiting.
 Nikolai (1836–1878), major general, married the countess Maria von Keller (1846–1931), granddaughter of Countess Amalie zu Sayn-Wittgenstein-Berleburg-Ludwigsburg, sister of Prince Peter zu Sayn-Wittgenstein, who, as Marie Kleinmichel, was the author of Memories of a Shipwrecked World. They had one surviving daughter, Olga.
 Alexander (1837–1856)
 Vladimir (1839–1882), major general
 Konstantin (1840–1912)
 Olga (1845–1920)
 Mikhail (1848–1872), died in Paris.

References

1789 births
People from the Russian Empire in rail transport
1869 deaths